Hazerswoude-Rijndijk is a Dutch village located in the province of South Holland. It is a part of the municipality of Alphen aan den Rijn, and lies about 5 km west of the village center.

Hazerswoude-Rijndijk is a peat excavation settlement which developed in the Middle Ages south of the Oude Rijn.

The Catholic St Bernardus Church is a single aisled church built between 1854 and 1855. The polder mill Groenendijkse Molen was built in 1627 as a wooden windmill. It was considered for replacement by a stone windmill several times. An electric pumping station was installed in 1959. In 1966, the windmill was bought by a foundation and restored to working order. It operates on a voluntary basis.

Gallery

References

Populated places in South Holland
Alphen aan den Rijn